"" is the national anthem of Guinea-Bissau.

It was also the national anthem of Cape Verde, a legacy of both countries' joint independence, until 1996, when a new anthem ("") was adopted by Cape Verde.

History 
The anthem was written by independence leader of Guinea-Bissau and Cape Verde Amílcar Cabral. Cabral, a Bissau-Guinean son of Bissau-Guineans and Cape Verdeans, was the leader of the African Party for the Independence of Guinea and Cape Verde (PAIGC).

In 1963, a delegation from then Portuguese Guinea visited China and heard music by composer . Cabral asked Xiao to compose a piece that would inspire his people in their struggle for independence. Set to a 1963 poem by Cabral, the piece was later adopted by Guinea Bissau and Cape Verde as the national anthem upon their independence from Portugal in 1974.

In the 1990s, after the African Party for the Independence of Cape Verde allowed multi-party rule, it was decided that Cape Verde should adopt its own national symbols, including a flag and anthem. A new anthem, "", was adopted in 1996.

Lyrics

Notes

References

External links 
 Guinea-Bissau: Esta É a Nossa Pátria Bem Amada - Audio of the national anthem of Guinea-Bissau, with information and lyrics (archive link)

African anthems
Bissau-Guinean music
National symbols of Guinea-Bissau
Portuguese-language songs
National anthem compositions in B-flat major